Live at the Concord Jazz Festival is a 1979 live album recorded at the Concord Jazz Festival by the Ray Brown Trio in August 1979. Singer Ernestine Anderson guest starred.

Track listing

"Blue Bossa" -	4:42
"Bossa Nova Do Marilla" -	4:04
"Manhã de Carnaval" -	6:43
"St. Louis Blues" -	4:48
"Fly Me To The Moon" -	3:34
"Georgia On My Mind" -	5:36
"Here's That Rainy Day" 	- 5:12
"Please Send Me Someone To Love" -	5:49
"Honeysuckle Rose" -	5:48

Personnel
Ray Brown - double bass
Monty Alexander - piano
Jeff Hamilton - drums
Ernestine Anderson - vocals

References

Ray Brown (musician) albums
1979 albums